Sa Tai or Style is a 2004 Burmese romantic comedy drama film directed by Mite Tee.

Plot
Maung Nay Toe is a very privileged child, the only son of a wealthy merchant family residing in Taunggyi. As his parents were very disciplined, he grew up well-behaved, being polite in speech and manner and sheltered from some of the harsher realities of life. Maung Nay Toe eventually leaves home and arrives in Yangon to pursue a music career and quickly becomes friends with poorer roommate Maung Yin Maung. One day, Maung Nay Toe goes to town to record a song and becomes infatuated with a girl named Ma Wah Saw Nge, the daughter of a retired school principal and equally privileged but shy, and also a snob. She gives him an ultimatum that unless he gives up his  singing and returns to his wealthy family, their love life would come to an end.

Meanwhile, Maung Yin Maung, having met a girl named Khayt at his training course, also falls in love, but they eventually drift apart due to stark differences in their personality traits and attitude.

Maung Nay Toe and Maung Yin Maung, now both suffering knock backs in love, begin to feel depressed and briefly suffer from insomnia. When they eventually get some sleep they have dreams which reflect their desires - to become acceptable to their ex-girlfriends and rekindle their relationships. What they do not know is that the girls also regret their actions and eventually they became lovers again.

Cast
Lwin Moe
Yar Zar Nay Win
Pyay Ti Oo
Soe Myat Nandar
Eaindra Kyaw Zin
Zarganar
Mos
Kin Kaung

Release
The film was first shown on June 11, 2004, at Twin, Tamata, Mingalar in Yangon, Win Lite, Myo Ma in Mandalay, Nyunt, Shwe Hin Tha, Ye Tan Kon in Bago and San Pya in Myeik, Tanintharyi Division.

References

2004 films
Burmese romantic comedy films
2000s Burmese-language films
2004 romantic comedy films